Route 108 is a two-lane east/west highway on the south shore of the Saint Lawrence River in the Eastern Townships and Chaudière-Appalaches regions of Quebec, Canada. Its eastern terminus is in Beauceville at the junction of Route 173, and the western terminus is at the junction of Route 112 in Magog.

Municipalities along Route 108

 Magog
 Sainte-Catherine-de-Hatley
 North Hatley
 Lennoxville
 Cookshire-Eaton
 Bury
 Lingwick
 Stornoway
 Saint-Romain
 Lambton
 Courcelles
 Saint-Évariste-de-Forsyth
 La Guadeloupe
 Saint-Éphrem-de-Beauce
 Saint-Victor
 Beauceville

Major intersections

See also

 List of Quebec provincial highways

References

External links 
 Official Transport Quebec Road Map (Courtesy of the Quebec Ministry of Transportation) 
 Route 108 on Google Maps

108
Transport in Magog, Quebec